Madina is a village in the Martuni Municipality of the Gegharkunik Province of Armenia. To the west of Madina is Mount Armaghan, an extinct volcano that rises 450 meters higher than the surrounding plain with a small crater lake at its center.

History 
According to the Russian statistical source Sbornik svedenij o Kavkaze, the village of Madina had as of 1873 a population of 208 people, all of them Azeris. By 1911, the population had risen to 443 people.

Gallery

References

External links 

 
 

Populated places in Gegharkunik Province
Populated places established in 1922
Cities and towns built in the Soviet Union